Meyerton is a small town lying 18 km north of Vereeniging in Gauteng, South Africa. It is situated in the Midvaal Local Municipality (of which it is the capital) in the Sedibeng District Municipality.

History
Meyerton was established in 1891 and was named after Johannes Petrus Meyer, a field cornet and member of the Transvaal Volksraad. It acquired municipal status in 1961.

Since 2001, Meyerton has been the administrative centre for the Midvaal Local Municipality. Many projects have been undertaken to develop the area in the past 14 years.

Some of these projects, include:
 Development of Sicelo, a new neighbourhood for low-cost housing
 The R59-Corridor, a new development of factories and logistics facilities.
 Heineken International, Amsterdam announced on 26 March 2008 that it will build its new South African brewery in the Midvaal Municipal Area, between Vereeniging and Alberton, south of Johannesburg.

Suburbs
Meyerton consists of the CBD, residential suburbs, industrial areas and farming communities. Some of the prominent neighbourhoods are;
 Golfpark
 Meyerton Ext 6
 Meyerton Ext 4
 Meyerton Ext 3
 Sicelo
 Henley-on-Klip
 Boltonwold
 Riversdale
 Rothdene
 Kookrus
 Glen Donald
 McKay Estates
 Risiville
 Valley settlements

Interesting facts
Meyerton is often reported as being the home of the Oprah Winfrey Leadership Academy for Girls which officially opened in January 2007 at Henley-on-Klip, but Henley on Klip is in fact separated from Meyerton. Henley on Klip is a small village and a bird sanctuary outside of Meyerton.

Meyerton is the location of SABC shortwave broadcasting facilities at Bloemendal.

Notable people
Chris van Heerden, boxer
Peter Teixeira, politician

Crime 

The latest annual crime statistics for the Meyerton Police Precinct was issued by the South African Police Service (SAPS) in 2021. The SAPS crime report showed the following information:

References

External links
Tuning Firm Dutch Automotive
Midvaal Local Municipality
Vaal Triangle Info
Meyerton Police Precinct

Populated places in the Midvaal Local Municipality